US Highway 18 (US 18) in the state of Wisconsin runs east–west across the southern part of the state.  The highway serves as major connecting route between Madison and the southwest corner of the state.  East of Madison, the route parallels Interstate 94 and serves as a local connection route to the communities along the interstate.  US 18 enters Wisconsin at Prairie du Chien and ends in downtown Milwaukee at Lincoln Memorial Drive, across from the Milwaukee Art Museum.

Route description
US 18 enters Crawford County from Iowa, crossing the Mississippi River using the Marquette-Joliet Bridge just west of Prairie du Chien. WIS 60 begins at the state line and runs concurrent with US 18 east from there.  The two highways turn south at the along with Wisconsin Highway 35 downtown and head southeast out of the city.  WIS 60 branches northeast from US 18 at Bridgeport.  US 18 and WIS 35 continue southeast into Grant County  The two highways split at Patch Grove with WIS 35 continuing southeastward along with WIS 133 south, while US 18 turns eastward along with WIS 133 north.  WIS 133 branches north at Mount Hope.  US 18 and US 61 junction in downtown Fennimore. and WIS 80 north joins the highway in Montfort, on the Iowa County line.

WIS 80 turns north at Cobb while US 18 continues east through Dodgeville, crossing WIS 23 and joining US 151 North.  The two U.S. routes share a common expressway and bypass Ridgeway and Barneveld on the way east into Dane County.  in Dane County, US 18 and US 151 bypass Mount Horeb, crossing WIS 78 and WIS 92, and Verona and enter the Madison area, first passing through Fitchburg.  Upon entering Madison, US 18 and US 151 join US 12 and US 14 east along the West Beltline Highway.  US 151 and US 14 turn off the beltline three miles (5 km) east and US 12 and US 18 continue east, crossing US 51 and I-39 / I-90 southeast of Madison.  Four miles east of the Interstates, US 12/US 18 becomes a two lane surface road again and passes through Cambridge, where US 12 splits southeast at the Jefferson County line.

US 18 crosses WIS 89 and WIS 26 in Jefferson and passes through Sullivan.  Entering Waukesha County, Wisconsin, US 18 passes north of Dousman at WIS 67, south of the Kettle Moraine State Forest - Lapham Peak Unit and north of Wales at WIS 83.  US 18 then enters Waukesha along Summit Avenue.  US 18 turns south from Summit Avenue on the new section of Les Paul Parkway (aka the new Waukesha West Bypass) and goes the entire route of Les Paul Parkway going around the West, South and East areas of the City of Waukesha along with the current WI 59 and WI 164 configuration from County Highway X and US 18 joins back up at Moreland Boulevard at the northeast terminus at the Les Paul Parkway/Wolf Road intersection.  So US 18 is now re-routed by using Les Paul Parkway and doesn't go through Downtown Waukesha anymore.  WIS 164 turns west onto I-94, and US 18 continues east into Brookfield along Blue Mound Road.  US 18 continues through Brookfield and Elm Grove along Blue Mound Road, and enter Milwaukee County and Wauwatosa.  US 18 crosses WIS 100, US 45, US 41,  and I-41 near the Milwaukee County Zoo and continues east into Milwaukee.  At WIS 175, the highway shifts onto Wisconsin Ave.  US 18 turns north onto North 35th street and east on to West Highland Ave where it crosses I-43 near downtown Milwaukee. US 18 turns south on 6th Street. East and westbound lanes split at State and 6th Streets; Eastbound continues south on 6th Street and then east on Wells Street. US 18 eastbound joins WIS 32 at North Broadway (southbound) and North Milwaukee Street (Northbound).  Both directions turn east onto East Michigan Street as WIS 32 continues south.  Westbound US 18 follows Milwaukee Street north from Michigan Street, turns west on State Street. At 6th Street, westbound  US 18 reaches its eastern terminus, the junction of Michigan Street and Lincoln Memorial Drive five blocks east of WIS 32, and one block north of I-794.

History

Prior to 1926, the route that US 18 follows today was designated as WIS 19.  By 1923, the WIS 19 extended from Prairie du Chien to Milwaukee.  Shortly after US 18 was signed, it was rerouted along WIS 30 and WIS 19 - the present route within Milwaukee.  The remainder of the route was relocated to its current alignment in 1932.

The eastern terminus was an originally stated in official DOT documentation to be the junction of East Michigan Street and North Harbor Drive.  This matched what commercial street maps were showing after many years of inaccuracies.

Between 1980 and 1990,  of US 18/US 151 was upgraded to expressway standards, with the section around Verona being the final piece to be completed in 1995.  US 12/US 18 was upgraded to expressway standards between I-39/I-90 to North Star Road, west of Cambridge.  The remainder wasn't expanded, but straightened out to eliminate sharp curves.

In 2019, as part of the construction to complete the Waukesha Bypass, US 18 has been rerouted as Temporary US 18 from WIS 83 in Wales, north along WIS 83 to I-94 and east along I-94 to exit 297 at Blue Mound Road where it rejoins the previous route.

That same year, two new interchanges opened in Fitchburg, replacing at-grade intersections with McKee Road (CTH PD) and Williamsburg Way.

Major intersections

See also

References

External links

  Waukesha Bypass Project Information

 Wisconsin
18
Transportation in Crawford County, Wisconsin
Transportation in Grant County, Wisconsin
Transportation in Iowa County, Wisconsin
Transportation in Dane County, Wisconsin
Transportation in Jefferson County, Wisconsin
Transportation in Waukesha County, Wisconsin
Transportation in Milwaukee County, Wisconsin